Mariá Cecilia Román (born 21 January 1983) is an Argentine professional boxer who  held the IBF female bantamweight title between 2017 and March 2022. As of September 2020, she is ranked as the world's third best active female bantamweight by BoxRec and fourth by The Ring.

Professional career
Román made her professional debut on 13 May 2011, scoring a four-round unanimous decision (UD) victory over Yessika Munoz at the Estadio Aldo Cantoni in San Juan, Argentina.

After compiling a record of 9–4–1, Román faced Anahi Yolanda Salles for the vacant Argentine female bantamweight title, with the bout taking place on 10 September 2016 at the Club Social y Deportivo Aberastain in Pocitos, Argentina. Román defeated Salles via UD over ten rounds, with the judges' scorecards reading 99.5–96.5, 99–96 and 98–95.

Her next fight came on 4 August 2017 at the Salon Tattersall in San Isidro, against Carolina Duer for the IBF female bantamweight title. Román captured the title via split decision (SD), with two judges scoring the bout 96–94 and 95–94 in favour of Román, while the third scored it 96–94 to Duer.

The first defence of her newly acquired title came four months later in December against Ana Maria Lozano. Román scored a disqualification (DQ) win in the second round after she suffered a cut on her forehead following a headbutt from Lozano in the opening round. She defeated Lozano via UD in an April 2018 rematch before defeating Duer for a second time in August via SD. Her final fight of 2018 was a six-round non-title bout against Vanesa Taborda in December at the Estadio Aldo Cantoni in San Juan. The referee called a halt to the fight in the second round after Román suffered a cut to her forehead resulting from an accidental clash of heads. The fight was ruled a no contest (NC).

She defended her title twice in 2019, scoring UD wins over Valeria Perez in March and Julieta Cardozo in August.

Professional boxing record

References

Living people
1983 births
Argentine women boxers
Bantamweight boxers
International Boxing Federation champions
World bantamweight boxing champions